Ants Tamme (born 20 April 1940) is an Estonian politician and journalist. He was an alternate member of VIII Riigikogu, representing the Estonian Party of Pensioners and Families (Eesti Pensionäride ja Perede Erakond).

He was born in Lelle Rural Municipality, Pärnu County. He graduated from Tallinn Pedagogical University in 1966, and has worked as an Estonian language and literature teacher.

References

Living people
1940 births
Estonian politicians
Members of the Riigikogu, 1995–1999
Tallinn University alumni
People from Kehtna Parish